Bageena is a village located in Chauth Ka Barwara tehsil of Sawai Madhopur district, Rajasthan, India.

References

Villages in Sawai Madhopur district